Stephanie Winslow (born August 27, 1956 in Yankton, South Dakota) is an American country artist. In the late 70s and 80s, she had a series of hit singles on the Billboard country music chart.

Career
In the late 1970s and early 1980s, Winslow recorded for Warner Bros. Records. Briefly married to her record producer, Ray Ruff, in 1979 she had her biggest hit single with "Say You Love Me," a cover of a Fleetwood Mac single from 1976 which reached #10 on the Billboard country chart in late 1979. In 1980 her cover version of Roy Orbison's "Crying," became Winslow's second major hit single, peaking at #14." She had two singles released on the Oak label in 1983, they were "Nobody Else For Me" bw "Another Night" and "A: Kiss Me Darling" by "Another Night". She had a series of minor hits on the Billboard country chart under Warner Bros., and eventually signed with MCA Records. Her final single with the label, in 1984, was a cover of "Baby, Come to Me."

Discography

Studio albums

Singles

References

External links
 

1956 births
Living people
American women country singers
American country singer-songwriters
People from Yankton, South Dakota
Curb Records artists
Oak Records artists
MCA Records artists
Warner Records artists
21st-century American women
Singer-songwriters from South Dakota